G. H. Thippareddy is an Indian Politician from the state of Karnataka. He is a five term member of the Karnataka Legislative Assembly.

Constituency
He represents the Chitradurga constituency.

Political Party
He won as an independent candidate in Chitradurga for the first time in 1994 Karnataka elections. He later joined the Indian National Congress party and was the MLA of Congress in Chitradurga constituency. He left the Congress party and joined Bharatiya Janata Party.

External links 
 Karnataka Legislative Assembly

References 

Living people
Bharatiya Janata Party politicians from Karnataka
Year of birth missing (living people)
Karnataka MLAs 1994–1999
Karnataka MLAs 1999–2004
Karnataka MLAs 2004–2007
Karnataka MLAs 2013–2018
Karnataka MLAs 2018–2023